Naji al-Suwaydi (Arabic: ناجي السويدي; 1882 – 17 August 1942) was an Iraqi politician who served as the prime minister from November 1929 to March 1930.

Naji al-Suwaydi became prime minister in November 1929, following the suicide of Abd al-Muhsin as-Sa'dun. His short time in the post was marked by street protests agitating for a treaty that would pave the way towards Iraqi independence from the British Mandate of Mesopotamia. That turmoil, combined with attacks from hostile newspapers and undermining from both King Faisal I and Nuri as-Said, led him to resign in March 1930.

Al-Suwaydi presided over the 1937 Bloudan Conference, one of the first pan-Arab conferences held in solidarity with Palestinian Arabs against the Zionist movement.

He served as Minister of Finance in 1930s and between 1940 and 1941.

He was the brother of Tawfiq al-Suwaydi, also a Prime Minister of Iraq.

References

 

1882 births
1942 deaths
Prime Ministers of Iraq
Finance ministers of Iraq
Justice ministers of Iraq